Miss International 1997, the 37th Miss International pageant, took place on 20 September 1997 at the Kyoto Kaikan First Hall in Kyoto, Japan. It was won by Consuelo Adler of Venezuela.

Results

Placements

Contestants

  - Nadia Jimena Cerri
  - Louisette Mariela Vlinder
  - Nadine Therese Bennett
  - Fabiana Nieva Caso
  - Valéria Cristina Böhm
  - Rachael Liza Warner
  - Ingrid Katherine Náder Haupt
  - Jadira Suleika Bislick
  - Gabriela Justinová
  - Elsa María Peña Rodríguez
  - Maria Hannele Hietanen
  - Marie Pauline Borg
  - Manuela Breer
  - Vanessa Stavrou
  - Glenda Irasema Cifuentes Ruíz
  - Christina Pei Jung Lin
  - Jennifer Elizabeth Parson Campbell
  - Charmaine Sheh
  - Diya Abraham
  - Lital Pnina Shapira
  - Sayuri Seki
  - Kim Ryang-hee
  - Nisrine Sami Nasr
  - Andrijana Acoska
  - Ramona Bonnici
  - Marisol Alonso González
  - Maria Theresa Falalimpa Acosta
  - Martha Graciela Maldonado
  - Ana Virginia Matallana Illich
  - Susan Jane Juan Ritter
  - Agnieszka Beata Myko
  - Lara Kátia Fonseca
  - Ymak Farrah Fagundo Soto
  - Victoria Vladimirovna Maloivan
  - Joey Chin Chin Chan
  - Monika Coculová
  - Isabel Gil Gambín
  - Hajer Radhouene
  - Kamile Burcu Esmersoy
  - Julia Vladimirovna Zharkova
  - Tanya Lorraine Miller
  - Consuelo Adler Hernández

Did not compete
  - Norma Elida Pérez Rodríguez

Notes

1997
1997 in Japan
1997 beauty pageants
Beauty pageants in Japan